Marton, Cheshire is a small village and civil parish in the unitary authority of Cheshire East and the ceremonial county of Cheshire, England on the A34 road 3 miles (5 km) north of Congleton.  Its correct postal address is "Marton, Macclesfield" which avoids confusion with "Marton, Winsford".

Its outstanding feature is the 14th-century timber-framed church of St James and St Paul, founded in 1343.  A plaque outside the church claims it is the oldest timber-framed church still in use in Europe.

Marton is also home to a sessile oak known as the Marton Oak. The oldest in Cheshire, it is one of the biggest oaks in Britain. Although its trunk is split, it has a single root system and is therefore regarded as a single tree.

Facilities
Marton & District primary school, founded in the 1960s to serve several local villages in a large catchment area, is aided by the Church of England and has a roll of between 180 and 200 children.

The village pub, the Davenport Arms, formerly housed an Italian restaurant, but  operates as a steakhouse. Nearby, converted farm buildings house a restaurant, La Popote; a café, the Old Barn; and a pet grooming salon, Gus & Bear.

See also

Listed buildings in Marton, Cheshire
St James' and St Paul's Church, Marton

References

External links

Villages in Cheshire
Civil parishes in Cheshire